Fissurina duplomarginata is a species of corticolous (bark-dwelling) lichen in the family Graphidaceae. Found in Singapore, it was formally described as a new species in 2015 by Gothamie Weerakoon and Robert Lücking. The type specimen was collected by the first author from a low-elevation primary forest in the Bukit Timah Nature Reserve. It is only known to occur at the type locality. It lacks a prothallus, soredia, and isidia. The photobiont partner is a member of the green algal genus Trentepohlia with yellowish-green cells measuring 8–14 by 6–9 μm; they occur in the lichen as a layer that is 20–60 μm thick. The species epithet refers to the double margin of the lirellae.

References

Ostropales
Lichen species
Lichens described in 2015
Taxa named by Robert Lücking
Taxa named by Gothamie Weerakoon